Nicholas Edward Brown (11 July 1849 in Redhill, Surrey – 25 November 1934 in Kew Gardens, London) was an English plant taxonomist and authority on succulents. He was also an authority on several families of plants, including Asclepiadaceae, Aizoaceae, Labiatae and Cape plants.

Background
He started work as an assistant in the Herbarium at Kew in 1873, and was Assistant Keeper from 1909 to 1914. His drawings of succulent plants were made in connection with his revision of the genus Mesembryanthemum, which appeared in 1931, and are accompanied by detailed annotations. He was the author of important works on plant taxonomy particularly succulent plants. The Araceae genus Nebrownia was named in his honour by Otto Kuntze. A number of plants bear the specific name "nebrownii" - such as Acacia nebrownii, Gibbaeum nebrownii, Caralluma nebrownii and Lithops olivacea v nebrownii, as does a waterhole in the Etosha National Park. The plant Anthurium brownii and the genus Brownanthus also bear his name.

He was awarded the Captain Scott Memorial Medal by the South African Biological Society in recognition of his work on SA flora, and in 1932 an honorary D.Sc. was conferred on him by the University of the Witwatersrand. His publications appeared mainly in the Kew Bull. and in Flora Capensis. He married the daughter of Thomas Cooper (1815–1913), another Kew botanist.

References

Kew.org

External links

1849 births
1934 deaths
English botanists
English taxonomists